The presence of a Romani minority in Ukraine was first documented in the early 15th century. The Romani maintained their social organizations and folkways, shunning non-Romani contacts, education and values, often as a reaction to anti-Romani attitudes and persecution. They adopted the language and faith of the dominant society, being Orthodox in most of Ukraine, Catholic in Western Ukraine and Zakarpattia Oblast, and Muslim in Crimea.

History

Origin
The Romani people originate from Northern India, presumably from the northwestern Indian states Rajasthan and Punjab.

The linguistic evidence has indisputably shown that roots of Romani language lie in India: the language has grammatical characteristics of Indian languages and shares with them a parts of the basic lexicon, for example, body parts or daily routines.

More exactly, Romani shares the basic lexicon with Hindi and Punjabi. It shares many phonetic features with Marwari, while its grammar is closest to Bengali.

Genetic findings in 2012 suggest the Romani originated in northwestern India and migrated as a group.
According to a genetic study in 2012, the ancestors of present scheduled tribes and scheduled caste populations of northern India, traditionally referred to collectively as the Ḍoma, are the likely ancestral populations of modern European Roma.

In February 2016, during the International Roma Conference, the Indian Minister of External Affairs stated that the people of the Roma community were children of India. The conference ended with a recommendation to the Government of India to recognize the Roma community spread across 30 countries as a part of the Indian diaspora.

Nowadays
During the 2022 invasion of Ukraine, Roma people suffered since the often lack of civil status documentation held off their access to humanitarian assistance.
Several sources report denying refugees access to European countries. EU Agency for Fundamental Rights (FRA) called for special attention to Roma seeking sanctuary.

The previous discouragement of the education of Roma girls hit them harder after the war disturbance in the education system.  Romani Ukrainians are also fighting Russian soldiers in Liubymivka. Despite being part of a marginalized minority, hundreds or Roma volunteered to fight for the Ukraine army.

Demographics
 Census 1897: 12,000 Romani in Russian Ukraine (without Galicia and Transcarpathia who comprise the highest Ukrainian Romani population)
 Census 1920: 60,000 Romani in Ukrainian SSR (without Galicia and Transcarpathia)
 Census 1959: 28,000 Romani in Ukrainian SSR
 Census 1970: 30,100 Romani in Ukrainian SSR. 
 Census 1979: 34,500 Romani in Ukrainian SSR
 Census 2001: 47,600 Romani in Ukraine. The estimate of the World Romani Union and the Council of Europe is considerably higher (around 400,000). In 2006 the Romani organizations estimated the number at over 400,000 persons.

Romani are scattered throughout Ukraine, but their largest concentration is in Zakarpattia Oblast. Half live in cities. 35% consider Romani their mother tongue.
Material culture has not differed from the dominant society except in dress. They have a rich folk tradition. Romani themes can be found in Ukrainian literature.

Sub-groups
The Muslim Roma migrated from Central Asia in the 17th and 18th century to Crimea peninsula.
Krimi (Крими), intermingled with Crimean Tatars. Further sub-groups include Audzhi (аюджі), Gurbety (гурбети), Mukani and others. During World War II Nazis killed 800 Krimi Roma in Simferopol. After the Nazi occupation, Stalin ordered all Crimean Tatars and Crimean Romani to be deported to Central Asia as "special settlers" in 1944, further devastating their community.
Gurbeti: The gypsy communities in Crimea in the 19th century were divided by "Yerli" (Yerli) and "Chingene" (Nomad). The Gurbeti (sometimes called Turkmen), lived mainly in the towns and steppe regions. They traded horses and products made out of horse meat (such as the popular chir-chir-byurek). The Krimurja in Crimea incorporated small numbers of Gurbeti through marriage, although in the 19th century they are listed as a separate group of "locals". Their small number likely prevented them from an own community. Their Romani language and nomadic lifestyle determined their separation to the Daifa, and their joining to the Krimurja. In spite of intermarriage between the Gurbeti and Krimurja, a distinct origin is remembered, and an internal separation to some extent has been preserved. Some in Crimea suggest that the "chingene" deny their gypsy origin and declare as Crimean Tatars.

Gallery

Notable people
Eugene Hütz
Oleksandr Noyok

See also
 Servitka Roma
 Romani people

References

Sources 

 Encyclopedia of Ukraine Vol. 2 (G-K) Toronto, 1988
 УКРАЇНСЬКІ ЦИГАНИ

Ukraine
 
Ethnic groups in Ukraine